The Republican Party (PLR) is a right-wing populist and conservative political party in Chile. Its founder and current leader is Chilean presidential candidate José Antonio Kast. The Republican Party is one of two parties in the Christian Social Front coalition, along with the smaller Christian Conservative Party.

History

Background

José Antonio Kast, the founder of the party, was a deputy for 16 years, and a member of the Independent Democratic Union (UDI) for 20 years. In 2017 he ran for president, finishing in fourth place with nearly 8% of the vote.

Kast became disillusioned with UDI and resigned in protest, believing that the party criticized former Chilean dictator Augusto Pinochet too often.

With the base of support he obtained with the election, he decided to found a political movement.

Foundation
The Republican Party began as the Chilean manifestation of the conservative wave in Latin America. On 3 March 2018, Kast held the first meeting of (what at that time was) the new movement. Some time after, on 9 April, the movement was presented at the Omnium Hall in Las Condes, and it was named "Acción Republicana" (Republican Action).

On 10 June 2019, Kast presented the party to the Servel, the party formation is still ongoing. More than half of the directive is composed of ex members of the UDI. One of them is the only deputy the party has in the Chamber of Deputies, Ignacio Urrutia.

On 21 January 2020, the Servel legally constituted the party in the regions of O'Higgins, Maule and Ñuble, after the necessary number of signatures was presented.

On 14 August 2020, the party was officially constituted in the regions of Biobío and Araucanía, at the same time violent incidents related with the Mapuche conflict were taking place in the zone.

On 9 September, the party was constituted in Santiago Metropolitan Region, and it was announced that it would present candidates to the municipal elections. On 19 July 2021, the party was constituted in the regions of Arica and Parinacota, Atacama, Aysén and Magallanes, making it a national-level party, constituted in all Chilean regions.

Ideology 
The Republican Party has been described as being far-right, authoritarian, conservative, nativist, nationalist and right-wing populist. Political scientist Cristóbal Rovira categorizes the party as belonging to a populist radical right, rather than far-right which is academically an incorrect label for the party. According to Political scientist Mireya Dávila the party contain some positions typical of the far-right, but notes also that far-right groups have also found expression in the older right-wing parties National Renewal and Independent Democratic Union.

The party's ideological doctrine is similar to the previously existing Gremialismo and is the main group of "organic Pinochetism", the new far-right in Chile, with the party receiving more support as centre-left and center-right parties began to reach a point of political convergence in the area policies and a perceived collusion in corruption as scandals arose. According to Cox and Blanco, the Republican Party appeared in Chilean politics in a similar manner to Spain's Vox party,  with both parties splitting off from an existing right wing party to collect disillusioned voters. The Republican Party calls for measures to reduce illegal immigration, including building a ditch along the border with Bolivia. The party describes recent popular protests in Chile as ideological terrorism and frames indigenous movements as narcoterrorism. Regarding economic policy, the Republican Party supports neoliberalism and a market economy, including cutting taxes. The Republican Party holds socially conservative views of a heteropatriarchal society and attaches itself to a traditional Western Christianity point of view, supporting a heterosexual nuclear family while opposing abortion and assisted suicide.

Kast has been recognized as the main leader of the Chilean extreme right for several years, consistently advocating neoliberal economics, anti-immigration policies and opposition to abortion and gay marriage.

Presidential candidates 
The following is a list of the presidential candidates supported by the Republican Party (information gathered from the Archive of Chilean Elections): 
2021 – José Antonio Kast (lost)

Electoral history

Presidential election

Congress election

References

External links

 Official web site

Nationalist parties in Chile
Right-wing populism in South America
Right-wing populist parties
Conservative parties in Chile
Political parties established in 2019
2019 establishments in Chile
Opposition to same-sex marriage
Right-wing parties in South America
Right-wing politics in Chile
National conservative parties
Social conservative parties
Far-right political parties in Chile